OMAC (Buddy Blank) is a superhero appearing in media published by DC Comics. He was created by Jack Kirby towards the end of his contract with the publisher following the cancellation of his New Gods series; it was reportedly developed strictly due to Kirby needing to fill his contractual quota of 15 pages a week. As envisioned by Kirby, OMAC is essentially Captain America set in the future, an idea he had toyed with some years earlier while at Marvel Comics but had never realized.

Publication history
Set in the near future ("The World That's Coming"), OMAC is a corporate nobody named Buddy Blank who is changed via a "computer-hormonal operation done by remote control" by an A.I. satellite called "Brother Eye" into the super-powered One-Man Army Corps (OMAC).

OMAC works for the Global Peace Agency (GPA), a group of faceless people who police the entire world using pacifistic weapons. The world balance is too dangerous for large armies, so OMAC is used as the main field enforcement agent for the Global Peace Agency. The character initially uses his abilities to save a female coworker at the Pseudo-People factory (manufacturers of androids initially intended as companions but later developed as assassins). The coworker is revealed to be in actuality a bomb, and Blank is left in the employ of the GPA, sacrificing his identity in their relentless war, with faux parents his only consolation and companions.

The original OMAC series ended with its eighth issue (November–December 1975), canceled before the last storyline could be completed, and Kirby wrote an abrupt ending to the series. In Kamandi #50, by other creators, OMAC is tied into the back-story and shown to be Kamandi's grandfather. An "OMAC" back-up feature by Jim Starlin began in issue #59 (Sept.–Oct. 1978), but Kamandi was cancelled after its first appearance. The story was later printed in The Warlord, and led to a new OMAC back-up series in that title (#37–39, 42–47). OMAC appeared with Superman in DC Comics Presents #61.

In 1991 OMAC was featured in a four-issue prestige format limited series by writer/artist John Byrne that was independent of the previous series. Byrne later reused OMAC in Superman & Batman: Generations 3, an Elseworlds limited series.

In Countdown to Final Crisis, Buddy Blank is featured as a retired, balding professor with a blond-haired grandson. In #34, he is mentioned but not seen, and is referred to as having direct contact with Brother Eye. He is contacted by Karate Kid and Una in Countdown #31, and appears in #28 and #27. A version of Buddy from Earth-51 appears in #6 and #5, in which the Morticoccus virus is released. The virus results in worldwide destruction. Buddy leaves his Project Cadmus laboratory job; assisted by Una, he attempts to rescue his daughter and grandson. They search for Buddy's family in Metropolis, where they are attacked by humanoid rats. Una and Buddy's daughter are both devoured, but one of them manages to pass a Legion flight ring to Buddy. He uses it to take his grandson to safety in the scientific facility "Command D" in Blüdhaven. In the final issue, Countdown to Final Crisis #1, Brother Eye rescues Buddy and his grandson from the bunker and from starvation by turning Buddy into a prototype OMAC with free will. This entity resembles the original Jack Kirby OMAC.

Powers and abilities
Through interfacing with the satellite, via an invisible beam to his receiver belt, Buddy Blank is transformed into OMAC and imbued with an array of superhuman abilities based on remote molecular rearrangement from Brother Eye. For example, an increase in his density grants superhuman strength and enhanced durability, and a decrease in his density allows flight and super-speed.  Brother Eye could provide other abilities as well, such as self-repair functions and energy generation.

Other versions

OMACs

The character and the Brother Eye satellite were reimagined for the Infinite Crisis storyline. OMACs are portrayed as cyborgs, humans whose bodies have been corrupted by a nano-virus. The characters retain OMAC's mohawk and Brother Eye symbol on their chests. The characters are featured in The OMAC Project limited series which precedes Infinite Crisis, and a subsequent OMAC limited series. The acronym has multiple meanings through the series: "Observational Meta-human Activity Construct", "One-Man Army Corps", and "Omni Mind And Community".

Other
 In the Superman storyline "For Tomorrow" (2004–2005), two super-soldiers called Equus were featured, each representing a generation of cybernetically enhanced warriors named "One-Man Army Corps" under Mr. Elias Orr. They bore no physical resemblance to any other version of the OMAC.
 The Tangent Comics comic The Joker's Wild (1998) parodied OMAC with a beta-version automated policeman called "Omegatech Mechanoid Armored Cop".
 DC would later make a nod to OMAC during the DC One Million event in 1998. In Superboy #1,000,000, one of the future Superboys is known as Superboy OMAC, or "One Millionth Actual Clone", and the title of the story was "One Million And Counting", repeating the acronym. He appeared in the Superboy and Young Justice specials, as well as the DC One Million mini-series. His appearance is based on OMAC, and he gains increased power from Brother Eye.
 In Kingdom Come, Alex Ross created a female version of OMAC named OWAC (One-Woman Army Corps).
 The DC One Million 80 Page Giant introduced a female Luthor with OMAC elements who called herself the One Woman Adversary Chamber.
 OMAC made a brief appearance in Elseworlds' JLA: Another Nail when all time periods meld together.
 Some basic OMAC units resembling the first OMAC were featured in Final Crisis.
 In the Multiversity series, the cyborg Ben Boxer (a character from the Kamandi series) is an OMAC, calling himself bioMAC.

In other media

Television

Buddy Blank / OMAC appears in the Batman: The Brave and the Bold episode "When OMAC Attacks!", voiced by Jeff Bennett. This version is from the present and is initially unaware of his dual nature as OMAC.

Toys
 OMAC was released as a figure in the Justice League Unlimited toyline and as a figure in wave 15 of Mattel's "DC Universe Classics" line.
 Versions of the modern OMAC have been released in both Mattel's DC Universe and DC Direct toy lines.

Collected editions
 Jack Kirby's O.M.A.C.: One Man Army Corps collects O.M.A.C.: One Man Army Corps #1–8, 200 pages, May 2008,

See also
 General Kafka
 Jack Kirby bibliography

References

External links 
 
 OMAC at Mike's Amazing World of Comics

1974 comics debuts
1991 comics debuts
Characters created by Jack Kirby
Comics by Jack Kirby
Comics by John Byrne (comics)
Comics characters introduced in 1974
DC Comics characters who can move at superhuman speeds
DC Comics characters with superhuman strength
DC Comics superheroes
Defunct American comics
Fictional janitors
Post-apocalyptic comics